Timpoko Helène Kienon-Kabore is an archaeologist from Côte d'Ivoire, who is Professor at the Research of Human Society and Science Unit at the University Felix Houphouet-Boigny. A specialist in historical metallurgy, she is an advisor on archaeological heritage at the Ministry of Culture and Francophonie of Côte d'Ivoire and is a Committee Member for the West African Archaeological Association.

Career 
Kienon-Kabore is Professor at the Research of Human Society and Science Unit at the University Felix Houphouet-Boigny of Cocody in Abidjan, Côte d'Ivoire. Her doctoral thesis entitled 'La métallurgie ancienne du fer au Burkina Faso, province du Bulkiemdé: approche ethnologique, historique, archéologique et métallographique' was awarded by Université de Paris I: Panthéon-Sorbonne in 1998. Her  research focuses on metallurgical analysis. She has published on the origins and development of metalwork in Burkina Faso and in Côte d'Ivoire. Her particular expertise lies in the analysis of the history of technology of African societies south of the Sahara. She has explored how important it is to take indigenous knowledge of metal-production is for understanding the past. In addition she has studied and published on population and palaeoenvironment in Senegal.
Kienon-Kabore is an advisor on archaeological heritage at the Ministry of Culture and Francophonie of Côte d'Ivoire. She is also a Committee Member for the West African Archaeological Association and has presented at their conferences.

References 

Living people
Ivorian women archaeologists
Year of birth missing (living people)
20th-century archaeologists
21st-century archaeologists
20th-century women scientists
21st-century women scientists
Ivorian archaeologists
Ivorian metallurgists
Ivorian women scientists